The Batnoam inscription is a Phoenician inscription (KAI 11 and TSSI III 26) on a sarcophagus. It is dated to c. 450-425 BCE.

It was published in Maurice Dunand's Fouilles de Byblos (volume I, 1926-1932, numbers 1142, plate XXVIII).

Text of the inscription
The inscription reads:

{|
|+ 
|-
| B’RN ZN ’NK BTN‘M || In this coffin I, Batno‘am,
|-
| ’M MLK ‘ZB‘L MLK GBL ||   mother of King Azbaal, King of Byblos,
|-
| BN PLṬB‘L KHN B‘LT ||     son of Pilletbaal, Priest of Baalat
|-
| ŠKBT ||       lie, 
|-
| BSWT WMR’Š ‘LY || wearing a garment and a head-piece on me,
|-
| WMḤSM ḤRṢ LPY ||   and a muzzle of gold on my mouth
|-
| KM ’Š LMLKYT ’Š KN LPNY ||     like those of the queens who were before me.
|}

Bibliography
 Christopher Rollston, "The Dating of the Early Royal Byblian Phoenician Inscriptions: A Response to Benjamin Sass."  MAARAV 15 (2008): 57–93.
 Benjamin Mazar, The Phoenician Inscriptions from Byblos and the Evolution of the Phoenician-Hebrew Alphabet, in The Early Biblical Period: Historical Studies (S. Ahituv and B. A. Levine, eds., Jerusalem: IES, 1986 [original publication: 1946]): 231–247.
 William F. Albright, The Phoenician Inscriptions of the Tenth Century B.C. from Byblus, JAOS 67 (1947): 153–154.

References

Phoenician inscriptions
Collections of the National Museum of Beirut
Phoenician sarcophagi
Archaeological artifacts
KAI inscriptions